Ma and Pa Kettle at Home is a 1954 American comedy film directed by Charles Lamont. It is the sixth, and also most successful, installment of Universal-International's Ma and Pa Kettle series starring Marjorie Main and Percy Kilbride.

Plot
The Kettles' son Elwin enters a scholarship contest by submitting a report on farming techniques to a national magazine. The essay claims that his family's own farm is a model of modern efficiency. The magazine's editor, intrigued, insists on visiting the farm himself. Ma and Pa Kettle try to camouflage their ramshackle farm to reflect Elwin's visualization, while trying to keep the fastidious editor from inspecting the premises too closely.

Cast

Production
The role of the magazine's fussy editor was written for character comedian Edward Everett Horton, who agreed to make the film. A last-minute scheduling conflict forced Horton to withdraw, and the role was taken instead by Alan Mowbray.

Release

Critical response
Film critic Leonard Maltin considers Ma and Pa Kettle at Home as "the best entry in the Ma and Pa Kettle series."

References

External links
 
 
 
 

1954 films
1954 comedy films
Films directed by Charles Lamont
American black-and-white films
Universal Pictures films
Ma and Pa Kettle
American comedy films
Films set in Washington (state)
Films set in New York City
American Christmas films
Films set in 1953
1950s English-language films
1950s American films